Pine Creek is a  tributary of the Maple River in Gratiot and Clinton counties in Michigan.  Via the Maple River, the creek's output flows into the Grand River and then into Lake Michigan.

See also
List of rivers of Michigan

References

Michigan Streamflow Data from the USGS

Rivers of Michigan
Rivers of Gratiot County, Michigan
Rivers of Clinton County, Michigan
Tributaries of Lake Michigan